Gražina is a Lithuanian feminine given name. The name was created by the Polish poet Adam Mickiewicz for the main character of his 1823 poem Grażyna. The name is derived from the Lithuanian adjective gražus, meaning "pretty", "beautiful". In Lithuanian tradition, the name day for Gražina is September 26.

People
Some of the notable Lithuanian people named Gražina include:

Gražina Degutytė-Švažienė (born 1938), ceramics artist
Gražina Didelytė (1938–2007), graphic artist and illustrator
Gražina Didžiūnaitytė (1940–2008), painter
Gražina Sviderskytė (born 1973),  newscaster and author

See also
Grażyna

References

Lithuanian feminine given names
Feminine given names